Lee Min-hyuk (born November 29, 1990), commonly known as Minhyuk or Huta, is a South Korean rapper, songwriter, actor, and presenter. He is a member of the South Korean boy group BtoB. He has appeared in multiple supporting roles in television series such as A New Leaf and Sweet, Savage Family.

Biography
Lee Minhyuk was born on November 29, 1990, in Seoul, South Korea. He's a rapper, vocalist, and dancer from the boy group BtoB. He graduated from Kwangsung High School and attended Dankook University, where he majored in film studies and continued to take his master's degree at Inha University majoring in culture management.

Career

Pre-debut
Prior to debuting in BtoB, Lee Min-hyuk had been active as an underground music artist, going by the moniker 'Huta'. In 2008-2009, alongside other underground artists Block B's Zico (then Nacseo) and Park Kyung (then Holke), they released a mixtape track "Nar.BINO" (여전히) .

Lee received training for 7 months, but as a musical student, he already had solid basic skills. Lee, together with fellow members of BtoB, Seo Eunkwang, Im Hyunsik, Jung Ilhoon, and a former Cube BtoB trainee Lee Minwoo (now ex C-Clown member T.K) acted in the JTBC show, I Live in Cheongdam-dong as a member of the fictional boy group 'Invincible Chungdam No. 5', before officially debuting as BtoB. 

On March 20, 2012, Lee was cast as the MC for SBS MTV's The Show along with Yook Sung-jae, a future member of BtoB.

BtoB

Lee made his debut as a member of boy-group BtoB in 2012. The group made their official debut on March 21, 2012 on M! Countdown.

On October 27, 2020, Cube announced that the currently active members of BtoB have formed a unit called BtoB 4U consisting Eunkwang, Minhyuk, Changsub and Peniel. The unit debuted on November 16 with their first mini-album, Inside and title track "Show Your Love".

Solo activities
In 2012, Lee was cast in a variety show, tvN's The Romantic & Idol 2. He also had multiple appearances since 2013 on Let's Go! Dream Team Season 2.

On January 22, 2013, he starred in the MBC variety and sitcom Reckless Family 2. In May, he made a guest appearance in the Mnet musical TV series Monstar, playing the role of Malo, a member of the group Man In Black. On September 4, he starred in tvN's Fantastic Tower, playing the male protagonist Min Ho who died 15 years ago but came back to life.

In 2014, he received supporting roles in the dramas A New Leaf and the idol special of Love & War 2. 

In 2015, joined the cast of Sweet, Savage Family. He also starred as a lead in the web-drama Nightmare Teacher.

Lee featured as a rapper under the stage name Heota in Postmen's "I'm OK", released on July 14, 2015.

Lee is also known for his athletics abilities, as he was crowned as the MVP of the 2014 Idol Star Athletics Championships, where his group, Team B, won and Lee won three gold medals and one silver medal.

Lee released the self-produced "Purple Rain" featuring Cheeze as part of BTOB's solo project series, Piece of BTOB on August 10, 2017. Later in the year on December 6, Childlike (유치해도) produced by Lee was released.

In 2018, Lee made his solo debut in Japan with his first Japanese EP, Summer Diary, released on July 25 with a total of five tracks.

In January 2019, Lee's solo Korean debut was announced with an all self-composed album, Hutazone. The album contains a total of eleven songs, including a Korean version of "All Day", "It Must Have Been A Dream" and "You Too? Me Too!", featuring Yook Sungjae and Jeon So-yeon, respectively. He held his first solo concert, Hutazone: Two Night in February 2019 at the Yes24 Live Hall in Gwangjin District, Seoul.

Lee made his silver screen debut in the historical action film, The Swordsman, as Gyeom Sa-bok.

Since November 1, 2021, 'KBS COOL FM', a Korean radio channel, has been hosting a radio program called 'BTOB's Kiss the Radio' at 10 p.m. every night.

On November 5, 2021, Lee released the digital single "Good Night".

On June 27, 2022, Lee released his second studio album, Boom.

Personal life 
Lee enlisted as a conscripted police officer on February 7, 2019. He was discharged on September 12, 2020.

Contracting with COVID-19 infection

South Korean news outlet Osen reported on July 14, 2021, Lee has undergone COVID-19 testing (rapid antigen and PCR test) after his vocal teacher tested positive for the virus. Fortunately, his results came negative, but he  still went into self-quarantine as a precautionary measure following government guidelines. During his quarantine, Lee showed symptoms of cough and fever on the 16th, and was confirmed positive for the virus on July 17. On July 30, he communicated with his fans through an Instagram live broadcast he revealed he suffered with high temperature, severe cough, pneumonia, headache, loss sense of smell and weight loss of four to five kilograms. "My temperature kept rising from 39 to 40 degrees Celsius [...] For about seven to eight days, starting from the day my symptoms first appeared, my temperature stayed 39 degrees for that entire week. They kept giving me fever reducers at the hospital. Still, even with the fever reducers, the lowest my temperature ever got was 38.3 degrees or 38.5 degrees Celsius. A few days later, Tedros Adhanom, the Director-General of the World Health Organization took to Twitter to share Lee's experience with the virus.

Discography

Studio albums

Extended plays

Singles

Production credits

Songs written and produced for other artists

Filmography

Film

Television series

Web series

Television shows

Radio shows

Concert
 HUTAZONE: Two Night (2 and 3 February 2019)
 BOOM (30 and 31 July 2022)

Awards and nominations

References

External links

 BTOB Official website 
 
 
 

1990 births
Living people
Cube Entertainment artists
South Korean male rappers
South Korean male film actors
South Korean male television actors
South Korean male idols
South Korean male web series actors
BtoB (band) members
Weekly Idol members
Rappers from Seoul
Male actors from Seoul
South Korean hip hop record producers